Antiquers Aerodrome (FAA LID: FD08) is a private facility for antique planes, located at 6664 Skyline Drive, Delray Beach, Florida.

External links
Official Site

Airports in Palm Beach County, Florida
Delray Beach, Florida
Airports for antique aircraft